Peer Bahora, is a village in the Bareilly District of Uttar Pradesh, India.

First internet cafe started here on 03-09-2012 Aqib Cyber World. you may visit the official website of aqib cyber world https://www.aqibcyberworld.in/

Villages in Bareilly district